Günther XLIII, Prince of Schwarzburg-Sondershausen (also known as Günther I; 13 August 1678 – 28 November 1740) was the ruling Prince of Schwarzburg-Sondershausen from 1720 until his death.

Life 
Prince Günther XLIII was son of Prince Christian William I  (1647-1721) and his wife Princess Antonie Sybille (1641-1684), a daughter of Count Albert Fredrick I of Barby-Mühlingen.

He took up government during his father's the lifetime, and in 1720 and continued as a fair, gentle and pious regent until his death.  In 1713, a decree had been issued instituting primogeniture, that is, the Prince's oldest son would be his sole successor, rather than having to share sovereignty with his younger brothers, or dividing the principality.

He made an end to foreign sovereignty over various parts of his principality, thereby increasing its prestige.  He built  new church in Jechaburg and a Princely House in Sondershausen.  His hobby was hunting, and he built a hunting lodge named  on the Hainleite near Sondershausen.  The name of the lodge was derived from a poem by his half-sister Christiane Wilhelmine.

After he died childless in 1740, his half-brother Henry XXXV inherited the principality.

Marriage 
On 2 October 1712 Günther married Elisabeth Albertine (1693-1774), a daughter of Prince Charles Frederick of Anhalt-Bernburg. The marriage was childless.

References 
 Friedrich Apfelstedt: Das Haus Kevernburg-Schwarzburg von seinem Ursprunge bis auf unsere Zeit, 
 Dr. Kamill von Behr: Genealogie der in Europa regierenden Fürstenhäuser, Leipzig, 1870

Princes of Schwarzburg-Sondershausen
House of Schwarzburg
1678 births
1740 deaths
18th-century German people